Christopher Atherton (born 19 October 2008) is a Northern Irish footballer who plays as a midfielder for Glenavon.

Club career
Atherton joined Glenavon at the age of five, as his elder brother was already enrolled in the club's academy. At the age of six, he was already playing at under-10 level, playing against players three years older than him. He also played Gaelic football as a youth, playing as a full forward for Maghery. He chose to focus on association football in the summer of 2022, when given the choice to represent Glenavon at the SuperCupNI, as the Northern Irish side finished runners-up to English side Charlton Athletic.

He trained with the Glenavon senior squad for the first time at the end of the 2021–22 season, at the age of thirteen. Manager Gary Hamilton was quoted as describing Atherton as "the best young player [he's] seen come through".

Atherton made his debut for Glenavon in a 6–0 Irish League Cup win against Dollingstown. Coming on as a substitute, he recorded an assist for Glenavon's sixth goal. In doing so, he became the youngest player ever in the United Kingdom, at 13 years and 329 days, breaking the record held by Scottish footballer Jordan Allan. The decision to play Atherton at such a young age drew criticism from some, with former Northern Irish international footballer Gareth McAuley disagreeing with the decision, suggesting that Glenavon had only handed Atherton his debut to garner a higher fee if he were to move to the academy of another side.

Following his debut, he drew the attention of English Premier League sides Chelsea and Manchester City, going on trial with the former, also spending time trialling with Scottish sides Dundee United and Rangers.

International career
Atherton is eligible to represent Northern Ireland, Scotland, as his father was born in Glasgow, and the Republic of Ireland, trialling with the youth side of the latter in 2021.

He was called up to the Northern Ireland under-16 squad for a mini tournament in October 2022, playing against Finland and Estonia, scoring against the latter. He was called up again for the Victory Shield, getting an assist against Wales in a 2–0 win.

Style of play
A player with a low centre of gravity, Atherton often takes players on during games, with Hamilton describing him as a player similar to Bernardo Silva or Phil Foden, able to play in both midfield and the forward line.

Career statistics

Club
.

References

2008 births
Living people
People from Northern Ireland of Scottish descent
Association footballers from Northern Ireland
Northern Ireland youth international footballers
Association football midfielders
Association football forwards
Glenavon F.C. players